The Thoroton Society of Nottinghamshire, generally known as the Thoroton Society, is Nottinghamshire’s principal historical and archaeological society. It was established in 1897, and takes its name from Dr Robert Thoroton who published the first county history of Nottinghamshire in 1677. It is a registered charity.

Aims
To promote knowledge, understanding and appreciation of the history, archaeology and antiquities of Nottinghamshire, and to support local research and conservation.

Governance
The society is governed by the Officers and Council of the Thoroton Society elected at the Annual General Meeting. The current president is Adrian Henstock BA DAA FRHistS.

Publications
The society has two main series of publications:
The Transactions of the Thoroton Society – published annually since 1897. The Transactions contain articles and reports describing the results of research into aspects of local history and archaeology.
Thoroton Society Record Series – a monographic series published occasionally since 1903. 47 volumes had been published by 2014. The Society functions as the record society for Nottinghamshire, and in this series publishes historical documents of significance for the county's history.

References

Further reading

External links

History of Nottinghamshire
Regional and local learned societies of the United Kingdom
1897 establishments in England
History organisations based in the United Kingdom
Archaeology of England
Charities based in Nottinghamshire
Organizations established in 1897
Text publication societies
Archaeological organizations